The Master of the Ortenberg Altarpiece was an anonymous German painter, active in Mainz during the first third of the fifteenth century. His work shows traces of the influence of Robert Campin. His name is derived from an altarpiece painted between 1410 and 1420 for the church of Ortenberg; this may currently be found in a museum collection in Darmstadt.

15th-century German painters
Ortenberg Altarpiece, Master of the